The Albertina Kerr Nursery is a historic building located at 424 NE 22nd Avenue in Northeast Portland, Oregon. It was built by the Johnson, Parker & Wallwork architecture firm in 1921, and was listed on the National Register of Historic Places on August 29, 1979.

See also
 Albertina Kerr
 National Register of Historic Places listings in Northeast Portland, Oregon

References

1921 establishments in Oregon
Buildings and structures completed in 1921
Colonial Revival architecture in Oregon
Georgian Revival architecture in Oregon
National Register of Historic Places in Portland, Oregon
Northeast Portland, Oregon
Kerns, Portland, Oregon
Portland Historic Landmarks